Grössinsee is a lake in Brandenburg, Germany. At an elevation of 33.2 m, its surface area is 0.94 km². It is located in the town of Trebbin, Teltow-Fläming district.

External links

Lakes of Brandenburg
Teltow-Fläming
LGrossinsee